Aeone Victoria Watson (born 22 April 1959, Liss, Hampshire, England), best known as her mononym Aeone (pronounced ay-own), is a British musician and singer-songwriter, who now lives in Los Angeles, California, United States. Her music has been classified as new age, folk or world music. She has released four albums, one of which was an internet only release. She now works extensively in film and TV and has over 60 movie trailers to her credit.  Early in her career, as Vikki, she represented the United Kingdom in the Eurovision Song Contest 1985 with the song "Love Is..." which came in fourth place.

Discography

Albums

References

External links

Official website

1959 births
Living people
Eurovision Song Contest entrants for the United Kingdom
Eurovision Song Contest entrants of 1985
English songwriters
People from Liss
English women pop singers